{{Infobox ethnic group
| group            = Bodo–Kachari Peoples
| image            = File:Kherai Dance of Assam.jpg
| image_caption    = Kherai Dance of Boro people
| population       =  12–14 million
| region1          = Assam
| pop1             = n/a
| region2          = Tripura
| pop2             = n/a
| region3          = Meghalaya
| pop3             = n/a
| region4          = Arunachal Pradesh
| pop4             = n/a
| rels             = Majority Native 
| related          = 
| languages        = Boro–Garo languages, Assamese language
}}Bodo–Kacharis (also Kacharis or Bodos) is a name used by anthropologist and linguists to define a collection of ethnic groups living predominantly in the Northeast Indian states of Assam, Tripura, and Meghalaya. These peoples are speakers of either Boro–Garo a subbranch of Tibeto-Burman languages or Assamese of Eastern Indo-Aryan languages and some of them possibly share ancestries. Some Tibeto-Burman speakers who live closely in and around the Brahmaputra valley, such as the Mising people and Karbi people, are not considered Bodo–Kachari.  Many of these peoples have formed early states in the late Medieval era of Indian history (Chutia Kingdom, Dimasa Kingdom, Koch dynasty, Twipra Kingdom) and came under varying degrees of Sanskritisation.

The speakers of Tibeto–Burman are considered to have reached the Brahmaputra valley via Tibet and settled in the foothills of the eastern Himalayan range which includes the whole of Assam, Tripura, North Bengal and parts of Bangladesh.  Boro language, one of the languages in the Boro–Garo group, has been recognised as an eighth scheduled Indian language in 2004.

The belief that Bodo–Kacharis were early settlers of the river valleys is taken from the fact that most of the rivers in the Brahmaputra valley today carry Tibeto–Burman names—Dibang, Dihang, Dikhou, Dihing, Doiyang, Doigrung etc.—where Di/Doi- means water in Boroic languages, and many of these names end in -ong, which is water in Austroasiatic. The Kacharis were also some of the first people to rear silkworms and produce silk material and were considered to be associated with ahu rice culture in Assam before the advent of sali (transplanted rice) was introduced from the Gangetic plains.

Some of the groups, such as Moran and Saraniya consider themselves as Hindus under Ekasarana Dharma. The Garo and the Koch peoples follow rules of matrilineal society.

Etymologies
Bodo
The term Bodo finds its first mention in the book by Hodgson in 1847, to refer to the Mech and Kachari peoples."As (Hodgson) admits in the end, his way of seeing the "Bodos" is twofold: he starts by using "Bodo" to designate a wide range of people (“a numerous race”), then wonders if some others are not "Bodos in disguise". He ends on a cautionary note and refrains from unmasking the dubious tribes, registering only the Mechs and Kacharis,..."  Grierson took this term Bodo to denote a section of the Assam-Burma group of the Tibeto-Burman languages of the Sino-Tibetan family, which included the languages of (1) Mech; (2) Rabha; (3) Lalung (Tiwa); (4) Dimasa (Hills Kachari); (5) Garo (6) Tiprasa and (7) Chutiya (Deuri). Subsequently Bodo emerged as an umbrella term both in anthropological and linguistic usage. This umbrella-group includes such sub-groups as Mech in Bengal and Nepal; Boros, Dimasa, Chutia, Sonowal, Moran, Rabha, Tiwa in Assam, and the Kokborok people in Tripura and Bangladesh."The term Bodo is also used to denote a large number of tribes-the Garos of Meghalaya, Tippera of Tripura, and Boro Kachari, Koch, Rabha, Lalung, Dimasa, Hajong, Chutia, Deuri, and Moran of Assam and other parts of the Northeast. (M N Brahma, "The Bodo-Kacharis of Assam---A brief Introduction" in Bulletin of the Tribal Research Institute [Gauhati], 1:1 [1983], p.52)"  This is in contrast to popular and socio-political usage, where Bodo denotes the politically dominant sub-group—the Boros—in the Bodoland Territorial Region."The media at the regional and national level; officials at the Centre and the state political parties of all hues and the people, in general, have accepted what may be termed as a contraction of the original denotion." 

The term Bodo generally stands for man in some of the cognate languages (Boro:Boro; Tripuri:Borok) but not in others (Garo:Mande; Karbi:Arlen). According to historians, the word "Bodo" is derived from the Tibetan Hbrogpa.  The umbrella name "Bodo", denoting the umbrella group, is resisted by numerically smaller groups such as the Dimasas.  Unlike Hodgson's assumption, Boro is no longer considered as the "core" of the Boro–Garo languages. Therefore, it has been suggested that the whole group should not be called "Bodo".But recent developments make it imperative to redefine the term Bodo and its wider denotation deserves to be abandoned in recognition of the emerging socio-political vocabulary; the Bodo means the plain tribes of western and northern Assam known earlier as the Bodo-Kacharis of the Brahmaputra Valley.

Kachari
The term Kachari has been used through much of history to denote the same people who came to be termed as Bodo.  One of the earliest usage can be found in the 16th century Assamese language Bhagavata. In Buranjis and colonial documents Boro–Garo speakers who were from the plains were collectively called Kachari. Endle's 1911 ethnographic work, The Kacharis, explain that there were plains Kacharis and hills Kacharis and a host of other ethnic groups that fall under the Kachari umbrella. Eventually the appellation kachari was retained only by those groups that have been fully integrated into Assamese society, such as Sarania Kachari, Sonowal Kachari, whereas others who were formerly called Kacharis have assumed ethnonyms, such as Boro or Dimasa.

Kachari is pronounced as Kachhāri or Kossāri. The origin of the name is most likely a self-designation korosa aris that is found in a very old Boro song:
Pra Ari, Korasa Ari
Jong pari lari lari
(We are Korosa Aris, first-born sea race
Our line is continuous)

Origins

Today the peoples included in the Bodo-Kacharis speak either one of the languages from the Boro–Garo branch of Tibeto-Burman or an Indo-Aryan language such as Assamese or Bengali.  It is generally believed that when the first Tibeto-Burman speakers entered the Brahmaputra valley, it was already populated by people speaking Austroasiatic and probably other language."(T)he valley was not deserted when the first (known) speakers of Tibeto-Burman languages arrived; they encountered people who spoke Mon-Khmer languages, of which the Khasi languages are the remnants.  Bodo-Kachari community traditions as well as scholars agree that they came from the north or the east; and current phylogenetic studies suggest that the Boro–Garo language descended from Proto-Tibeto-Burman in Northern China near the Yellow River. Linguists suggest that the initial ingress took place 3000 years before present or earlier, and that the immigrant proto-Boro–Garo speakers were not as numerous as the natives. Linguists find the Boro–Garo languages remarkable in two aspects—they have a highly creolised grammar, and they extend over a vast region that radiates out into Nepal and Tripura from the Brahmaputra valley.

The origin of the Kachári race is still very largely a matter of conjecture and inference, in the absence of anything entitled to be regarded as authentic history. As remarked above, in feature and general appearance they approximate very closely to the Mongolian type; and this would seem to point to Tibet and China as the original home of the race. The Garos, a race obviously near of kin to the Kacháris, have a tradition that in the dim and distant past their forefathers, i.e., nine headmen, the offspring of a Hindu fakir and a Tibetan woman, came down from the northern mountains, and, after a halt at Koch- Behar, made their way to Jogighopa, and thence [4]across the Brahmaputra to Dalgoma, and so finally into the Garo Hills. It is not easy to say what degree of value is to be attached to this tradition, but it does at least suggest a line of inquiry that might well be followed up with advantage.￼

It is possible that there were at least two great immigrations from the north and north-east into the rich valley of the Brahmaputra, i.e., one entering North- east Bengal and Western Assam through the valley of the Tista, Dharla, Sankosh, &c., and founding there what was formerly the powerful kingdom of Kāmārupa; and the other making its way through the Subansiri, Dibong and Dihong valleys into Eastern Assam, where a branch of the widespread Kachári race, known as Chutiyás, undoubtedly held sway for a lengthened period. The capital quarters of this last- mentioned people (the Chutiyás) was at or near the modern Sadiya, not far from which certain ruins of much interest, including a copper-roofed temple (Támár ghar), are still to be seen. It is indeed not at all unlikely that the people known to us as Kacháris and to themselves as Baḍa (Bara), were in earlier days the dominant race in Assam; and as such they would seem to have left traces of this domination in the nomenclature of some of the physical features of the country, e.g., the Kachári word for water (di; doi) apparently forms the first syllable of the names of many of the chief rivers of the province, such as Diputá, Dihong, Dibong, Dibru, Dihing, Dimu, Desáng, Diku (cf. khu Tista), &c., and to these may be added Dikrang, Diphu, Digáru, &c., all near Sadiya, the earliest known centre of Chutiá (Kachári) power and civilisation.￼

Emergence of Boro–Garo as lingua franca
, giving the examples of Nagamese, Jingpho, and Garo today, has suggested that they are in different stages in the development of lingua francas, a cycle which leads to mixed and creolised languages, language shifts, linguistic discontinuities and ethnic mixing. It is estimated that Austroasiatic languages were present even as late as 4th-5th centuries CE, which is also supported by paleographic evidence from the Kamarupa inscriptions.  The heavy creolisation occurred when Boro–Garo emerged as the lingua franca of the Tibeto-Burman and Austroasiatic populations of pre-Kamarupa, Kamarupa and post-Kamarupa kingdoms and polities of Assam, a proposition that other linguists find compelling, The Proto-Boro–Garo first as a lingua franca used for communication across the various linguistic communicates of the region and its striking simplicity and transparency reflect a period when it was widely spoken by communities for whom it was not a native language. Among these ethnic groups some of the Garo, Rabha, and Koch may have Khasi ancestors. The Tibeto-Burmification''' of the Valley must have been more a matter of language replacement than the wholesale population replacement. Some of the Boro–Garo speaking communities such as the matrilineal and uxorilocal Garo, Rabha, and to some extent Koch still retain cultural features that are found among Austroasiatic speakers and which are not found among other Tibeto-Burman speakers. Genetic studies too have shown that the Tibeto-Burman communities of Northeast India harbour significant population that were originally Austroasiatic speaking—for example, genetic studies show presence of O2a-M95, a haplogroup associated with AA populations, among the Garos.

Groups

Boro

The Boro people, also called Bodo, are found concentrated in the duars regions, north of Goalpara and Kamrup. The origin of Kachari term was unknown to Boro themselves, but known to others. They call themselves as Boro, Bada, Bodo, Barafisa. Barafisa translated as Children of the Bara (the great one).

Mech

The Mech are found in both Assam and Bengal. Hodgson (1847) wrote as "Mech is name imposed by strangers. This people call themselves as Bodo. Thus, Bodo is their proper designation" They speak mainly the Boro language J.D Anderson wrote, "In Assam proper Hindus call them Kacharis, In Bengal they are known as Meches. Their own name for the race is Boro or Bodo."

Dimasa

Dimasas have a ruling clan among themselves who are termed as Hasnusa. Some Dimasa scholars opined that they were also known as Hasnusa at some point of time in History.

Chutia

Among Chutias, Burok means noble/great men. The Chutias who were thought to be healthy and strong was termed as Burok and took up the administrative and military roles in the Chutia kingdom. Even the Matak king Sarbananda Singha belonged to the Burok Chutia clan. Surnames like Bora, Borha, Borua have their origins in the Chutia kingdom and are related to Bara/Bodo/Buruk. There is mention of Manik Chandra Barua, Dhela Bora, Borhuloi Barua as commanders of Chutia army.

Moran

The Morans called their leader/chief as Bodousa (great son) where 'sa' means child or son in Moran language.

Deori

The Deoris (who were priests by profession) also have the Burok clan among them.

Tiwa (Lalung)

Tiwa (Lalung) is an ethnic group mainly inhabiting the states of Assam and Meghalaya in northeastern India.  They were known as Lalungs in the Assamese Buranjis, though members of the group prefer to call themselves Tiwa (meaning "the people who were lifted from below"). Some of their neighbors still call them Lalung. A striking peculiarity of the Tiwa is their division into two sub-groups, Hill Tiwa and Plains Tiwas, displaying contrasting cultural features. The hill Tiwas speak Tiwa and follows matrilineality while the plain Tiwa who are more numerous in number speak Assamese and adhere to a patrilineal form of society.

Tripuri

The Tripuris are the inhabitants of the Tripura Kingdom. The Tripuri people through Manikya dynasty ruled the Kingdom of Tripura.

History
The Tripuri, Chutia, Koch, and Dimasa had established powerful kingdoms in the past. The Tripuri kings had even defeated the Mughals and the Burmese kingdoms in the past. Today, the Boros, the Tripuris, and the Garos have established a strong political and ethnic identity and are developing their language and literature. The Sonowal Kachari is also a branch of greater Kachari. They live in the districts of Dibrugarh, Tinsukia, Dhemaji, Sivasagar, Lakhimpur, Golaghat and Jorhat.

Notes

References

 
 

 
 
 
 
 
 
 
 
 
 
 
 
 
 
 
 
 
 
 
 
 
 
 
 
 
 

Social groups of Assam
Tribes of Assam
Ethnic groups in Northeast India
Scheduled Tribes of Meghalaya
Scheduled Tribes of Assam
Scheduled Tribes of Nagaland
Ethnic groups in South Asia